The 1951–52 Soviet Cup was the second edition of the Soviet Cup ice hockey tournament. In total, 27 teams participated in the tournament, which was won by VVS MVO Moscow.

Tournament

1/16 Finals

1/8 Finals

Quarterfinals

Semifinals

Final 

(* The game was annulled and the replayed game was won 3-2 by VEF Riga. ** The game was not contested due to one of the teams not participating.)

External links
 Season on hockeyarchives.info
 Season on hockeyarchives.ru

Cup
Soviet Cup (ice hockey) seasons